Farma 5 - Znovuzrodenie (English: The Farm 5 - Rebirth) is the Slovak version of The Farm reality television show based on the Swedish television series of the same name. The show filmed from August 2014 to November 2014 and premiered on August 28, 2014 on Markíza.

Format
Twelve contestants are cut out from outside world. Each week one contestant is selected the Farmer of the Week. In the first week, the contestants choose the Farmer. Since week 2, the Farmer is chosen by the contestant evicted in the previous week.

Nomination Process
The Farmer of the Week nominates two people (a man and a woman) as the Butlers. The others must decide, which Butler is the first to go to the Battle. That person than choose the second person (from the same sex) for the Battle and also the type of battle (a quiz, extrusion, endurance, sleight). The Battle winner must win two duels. The Battle loser is evicted from the game. In the live final 18 December 2014 Lenka Švaralová won 50 000 € . Tibor Repa finish on the second place. Lenka Švaralová won title Favorit Farmer.

Contestants 
Ages stated are at time of contest.

Future appearances
Alžbeta Janíčková, Reza Givili, Lenka Hrčková, Lucia Mokráňová and Miriam Pribanić returned to Farma for Farma: All-Stars, respectively placing 11th and 10th, Hrčková was evacuated after 49 days and placing 7th. Pribanić made it to the Final 3 where she lost duel and placing 3rd while Mokráňová reach the final and finished 2nd. Pribanić also competed on the Croatian Farma 4 before All Stars where she finished 6th out of 18.

Nominations

The game

External links
http://farma.markiza.sk
 Farma Markíza 

The Farm (franchise)
2014 Slovak television seasons